Ghandour is an Arabic surname. Notable people with this surname include:

Ahmed Ghandour, Jordanian scientist
Ali Ghandour (1931–2020), Lebanese-Jordanian businessman
Fadi Ghandour (born 1959), Jordanian-Lebanese businessman
Gamal Al-Ghandour (born 1957), Egyptian football referee
Hady Ghandour (born 2000), Lebanese footballer
Ibrahim Ghandour (born 1952), Sudanese politician
Khaled El Ghandour (born 1970), Egyptian footballer
Khaled El Ghandour (born 1991), Egyptian footballer
Zahraa Ghandour (born 1991), Iraqi actress and film director

See also
Gandour, a food processing company
Sidi El Ghandour, a commune in Morocco